The Children's Museum of South Dakota is a children's museum located in Brookings, South Dakota. Founded in 2010 in a renovated Brookings elementary school, The Children's Museum of South Dakota's 44,000 square foot building contains over 5,000 "loose parts," and is supported by both an outdoor playground and a cafeteria, Café Coteau. It includes several year-round play areas, as well as "Mama," one of the only full-size permanent, animatronic T. rex specimens in the United States, and an interactive "stickwork" installation by Patrick Dougherty called Tangle Town.

The Children's Museum of South Dakota is a non-profit organization, managed and supported through an endowment from The Dale and Pat Larson family foundation. The museum sees more than 100,000 visitors annually.

References 

South Dakota
Brookings, South Dakota
Museums in Brookings County, South Dakota